Zé Vitor may refer to:

 Zé Vítor (footballer, born 1982), born José Vítor Jardim Vieira, Portuguese football midfielder
 Zé Vitor (footballer, born 1991), born José Vitor Rodrigues Ribeiro da Silva, Brazilian football defensive midfielder
 Zé Vitor (footballer, born 2001), born José Vitor Lima Cardoso, Brazilian football defender
 Zé Vitor (footballer, born 2002), born José Vitor Geminiano Cavalieri, Brazilian football defender

See also
 Zé Victor (born 1990), born José Victor de Souza dos Santos, Brazilian football midfielder